was a  after Tenroku and before Jōgen. This period spanned the years from December 973 through July 976.

Change of era
 February 6, 973 : The new era name was created to mark an event or a number of events. The previous era ended and a new one commenced in Tenroku 4, on the 20th day of the 12th month of 973.

Events of the Ten'en era
 May 28, 973 (Ten'en 1, 24th day of the 4th month): A fire broke out in a Minamoto compound located near the Imperial Palace. The fire could not be contained; and more than 300 houses were reduced to cinders. The guard was doubled around the Emperor's residence.
 974 (Ten'en 2, 2nd month): Fujiwara no Kanemichi was named Daijō-daijin; and he was given permission to travel to court in a carriage.
 974 (Ten'en 2, 10th month): The emperor received a gift of horses from Korea.
 975 (Ten'en 3, 8th month): A comet was seen in the night sky.

Notes

References
 Brown, Delmer M. and Ichirō Ishida, eds. (1979).  Gukanshō: The Future and the Past. Berkeley: University of California Press. ;  OCLC 251325323
 Nussbaum, Louis-Frédéric and Käthe Roth. (2005).  Japan encyclopedia. Cambridge: Harvard University Press. ;  OCLC 58053128
 Titsingh, Isaac. (1834). Nihon Ōdai Ichiran; ou,  Annales des empereurs du Japon.  Paris: Royal Asiatic Society, Oriental Translation Fund of Great Britain and Ireland. OCLC 5850691
 Varley, H. Paul. (1980). A Chronicle of Gods and Sovereigns: Jinnō Shōtōki of Kitabatake Chikafusa. New York: Columbia University Press. ;  OCLC 6042764

External links
 National Diet Library, "The Japanese Calendar" -- historical overview plus illustrative images from library's collection

Japanese eras